Luis de Miranda is a philosopher and novelist. His earlier books, written in French, have been translated into English, Chinese, Swedish, among other languages. A PhD from the University of Edinburgh, he previously graduated in philosophy at Pantheon-Sorbonne University and in economics at HEC Paris. Since 2018, Luis de Miranda is a philosophical practitioner and member of the Swedish Society for Philosophical Practice, and an academic researcher in Sweden.

Between 2005-2012 he gathered his literary and philosophical projects under the name of "Crealism"). Arsenal du Midi, his virtual writing laboratory from 2004 to 2007, used one of two anagrammatic signatures "Arsenal du Midi" and "Animal du Désir" to explore the triple dimension of creation: natural, egotistic and idealistic. His philosophical essays develop a specific interest for societal issues, historical methods, technological devices, and the cosmological concept of continuous creation via process philosophy (Deleuze, Bergson, Heraclitus, Alfred North Whitehead, Hegel). He has written a cultural and philosophical history of neon signs published by MIT Press (Being & Neonness), a philosophical history of digital devices and automata (L'art d'être libres au temps des automates), presented by the French magazine Sciences Humaines as "a new utopia", "both philosophical, literary, artistic and scientific, an analysis of the Lacanian concept of jouissance in its relation with capitalism, and a study on Deleuze which was translated and published by Edinburgh University Press (Deleuze Studies). In all of these he developed his concept of "Creal" or "creative Real".

Oeuvre 
He was awarded his Doctor of Philosophy (PhD) from the University of Edinburgh in 2017 and soon after came out his book Ensemblance, based on his doctoral work and published by Edinburgh University Press. While researching and teaching at the University of Edinburgh he founded the CRAG (Creation of Reality Group) and the Anthrobotics Cluster.

From September 2014 to March 2017 Luis de Miranda conducted his PhD research on the concept of esprit de corps. at the University of Edinburgh He explored the ideas of collective existence and the hive mind from a discourse analysis and conceptual history perspective: "Beyond well-being, “well-belonging” is a fundamental human aspiration. But so is individual autonomy." His research is multidisciplinary, focused on diverse questions such as What is Life?, process philosophy, social creation, discourse analysis, cultural and conceptual history and French philosophy, intellectual history, with, in his publications until 2020, an emphasis on Deleuze (and Guattari), Lacan, Bergson, Foucault. De Miranda's core concept of 'Creal' explores a form of post- or pre-anthropocentric creativity and notions as (collective) agency, autonomy, subjectivity, social creation, empiricism, biotechnologies, philosophy as care, and esprit de corps.

Along with the Creation of Reality Group, he was the founder of the Anthrobotics Cluster, "a platform of cross-disciplinary research" working on the relationship between humans, robots and artificial intelligence: "partial automation is part of the definition of what humans have always been", "a hybrid unity made of flesh and protocols, creation and creature".

Since 2019, Luis de Miranda is working both empirically and theoretically on the concept of "philosophical health". In a talk at the UNESCO headquarters, de Miranda said: "“Philosophical health will be in the 21st century what physical and psychological health were in the 20th century. At the beginning of the century, it is a luxury for the happy few. By the end of the century, it is a necessity for all."

The Creal and Crealectics 
His philosophical essay "Is a new life possible?", published by Edinburgh University Press, and one of the most downloaded Deleuze Studies articles between 2013 and 2015, is an attempt to present an overview of Deleuze's philosophy through the concept of lines of life and the Creal. In his dialogues with Claire Parnet, Deleuze asserts that: "Whether we are individuals or groups, we are made of lines" (Deleuze and Parnet 2007: 124). Luis de Miranda explains how a singular individual or group may arise from the play of the lines of life; eventually, he introduces the concept of 'Creal' to develop the Deleuzian figure of the 'Anomal', the so(u)rcerer, the active rather than reactive Nietzschean creator.

"The relationship between crealism and digitalism [numérisme] is the dialectic of the 21st century". Partly born out of his readings of Jacques Lacan, Karl Marx, Gilles Deleuze and Martin Heidegger between 2003-2007, The Creal (Créel in French), crealism or more recently crealectics is Luis de Miranda's proposed answer to the philosophical problem of the Real: "Creal is obviously a portmanteau compound of created-real. At the same time, in an essay on Deleuze (Is a New Life Possible?), in my novels Paridaiza and Who Killed the Poet? and in the essay Being & Neonness, a Creal-cosmology is proposed. A philosophical concept answers a question and Creal is my answer to the question What is more real than the Real?". Since 2017, Luis de Miranda seems to be systematically using the concept of "crealectics" instead of crealism: "crealectics integrates but supersedes the analytical and dialectical modes of thinking into a practice of prognosis, a meta-anticipation of what is likely to be actualised. A crealectical intelligence integrates and unifies the pluridimensionality and pluridirectionality of living and spiritual processes. It corresponds perhaps to what Spinoza called the third kind of knowledge."

Who Killed The Poet? 
In Spring 2017 to coincide with the imminent publication of the English translation of Qui a tué le poète? Luis de Miranda launched a world literature project to disseminate several translations of his novella. Its aim is to explore the "transnational existential grammar of the book and its universal themes, which although written in differing languages and using their own poetry describe the same human emotions". In an interview with World Literature Today, Luis de Miranda described this collective project, performed with the collaboration of a network of translators, as "reawakening a sort of universal reader". Who Killed The Poet? was translated by Tina Kover and joins the already published Turkish edition with Chinese and Swedish translations.

Novels 
 Luis de Miranda, "Joie", Éditions Le Temps Des Cerises, Paris, November 1997
 Luis de Miranda, "La mémoire de Ruben", Éditions Gamma Press, Nivelles, September 1998
 Luis de Miranda, "Le spray", Éditions Calmann-Lévy, Paris, February 23, 2000, 192 p.
 Luis de Miranda, "À vide", Éditions Denoël, Paris, September 2001, 246 p.
 Luis de Miranda, "Moment magnétique de l'aimant", Éditions La Chasse au Snark, Paris, August 28, 2002, 160 p. Moment magnétique
 Hélène Delmotte & Luis de Miranda, "Expulsion", Max Milo Éditions, coll. « Condition humaine », Paris, January 1, 2005, 123 p.
 Luis de Miranda, "Paridaiza", Éditions Plon, Paris, August 21, 2008, 200 p.
 Luis de Miranda, "Qui a tué le poète?", Max Milo Éditions, coll. « Condition humaine », Paris, January 1, 2011, 156 p.
 Luis de Miranda, "Who Killed The Poet?", Snuggly Books, Sacramento, CA, October 2, 2017, 130 p.
 Luis de Miranda, "Paridaiza", Snuggly Books, Sacramento, CA, November 3, 2020, 204 p.

Philosophical essays 
 Luis de Miranda, "Being & Neonness", MIT Press, Cambridge, MA, April 18, 2019, 130 p.
 Luis de Miranda, "Ensemblance", Edinburgh University Press, Edinburgh, February 25, 2019, 300 p.
 Luis de Miranda, "Ego Trip" : La Société des artistes sans oeuvres, Éditions Max Milo, coll. « Mad », Paris, April 1, 2003, 125 p.
 Luis de Miranda, "Peut-on jouir du capitalisme ?", Éditions Punctum, Paris, March 5, 2008, 125 p.
 Luis de Miranda, "Une vie nouvelle est-elle possible ?", Éditions Nous, Paris, February 2009
 Luis de Miranda, "L'Art d'être libres au temps des automates", Éditions Max Milo, Paris, January 2010, 224 p.
 Luis de Miranda, "L’être et le néon", Éditions Max Milo, Paris, January 2012, 224 p.

References

External links 

 
 Who Killed The Poet? Worldwide Translations Project

French novelists
1971 births
Living people
French male novelists
French philosophers
Alumni of the University of Edinburgh
Pantheon-Sorbonne University alumni
HEC Paris alumni